Moffit is an unincorporated community in Burleigh County, North Dakota, United States.  It lies along US 83, 10 miles south of Sterling. Moffit's ZIP code is 58560.

A post office called Moffit has been in operation since 1906. The community's name honors a family of settlers. In the early 2010s one of the last business buildings left on main street was stripped and torn down for unknown reasons. There is also another building on main street of unknown origin that, in 2017, the front was cut into and it was turned into a storage building. Today, only a bar and post office remain in operation. The population in 2017 was estimated to be less than 30.

References

External links
Moffit, North Dakota, 75 years, 1905-1980 from the Digital Horizons website

Unincorporated communities in North Dakota
Unincorporated communities in Burleigh County, North Dakota